Sutiya "Nee" Jiewchaloemmit (born: May 3, 1986 in Tambon  Khao Chakan, Prachinburi Province (currently: Khao Chakan District, Sa Kaeo Province) is a Thai sport shooter. She competed at the 2008 Summer Olympics in Beijing, where she placed fifth in skeet. She also competed at the 2012 Summer Olympics in London, 2016 Summer Olympics in Rio, and 2020 Summer Olympics in Tokyo. She graduated with a Bachelor's Degree in Accounting and Commerce from Thammasat University

References

External links

1986 births
Living people
Sutiya Jiewchaloemmit
Sutiya Jiewchaloemmit
Sutiya Jiewchaloemmit
Shooters at the 2008 Summer Olympics
Shooters at the 2012 Summer Olympics
Shooters at the 2016 Summer Olympics
Skeet shooters
Asian Games medalists in shooting
Shooters at the 2006 Asian Games
Shooters at the 2010 Asian Games
Shooters at the 2014 Asian Games
Shooters at the 2018 Asian Games
Sutiya Jiewchaloemmit
Sutiya Jiewchaloemmit
Medalists at the 2010 Asian Games
Medalists at the 2014 Asian Games
Medalists at the 2018 Asian Games
Sutiya Jiewchaloemmit
Southeast Asian Games medalists in shooting
Competitors at the 2007 Southeast Asian Games
Sutiya Jiewchaloemmit
Shooters at the 2020 Summer Olympics
Sutiya Jiewchaloemmit